Mimosa Public school is a co-educational Public school in Frenchs Forest Sydney, Australia, operated by the New South Wales Department of Education and Training with students from years K–6. Students at the school come from the west half of Frenchs Forest.

History 
Mimosa Public School was originally to be called Sorlie Public School after George Sorlie, an idealistic developer of land in the district. With the growth of the Belrose area in the 1960s, the New South Wales Department of Education made the decision to have a new area school alongside Frenchs Forest, Belrose and Wakehurst Public Schools. Construction commenced in 1969 for an anticipated 1970 opening. On 27 November 1969 the P&C Association of the proposed "Sorlie Public School" met along with the Principal-elect, Keith Archbold, at Wakehurst Public School to initiate plans for opening the school. It was at this meeting that school uniforms were decided upon, however it was also felt that the name was not well chosen, and alternatives were proposed by a "Renaming" Committee. At the next P&C meeting on 19 January 1970, the members forwarded their name nomination, "Birralee", to the Geographic names board; this was later rejected on grounds that it was already in use by another school. It was also at this meeting that the Principal announced that a High School would be built on the land adjacent to the school, with construction commencing in 1972. This would later become Davidson High School.

The School opened on 27 January 1970, however the school was still incomplete and under construction and the first 184 enrolled students took classes at Wakehurst Public School. By late 1970, with the first stage finished, the school population had grown to over 300. The renaming committee also had advised that the school would no longer be called "Sorlie", but had difficulty deciding upon a new name after previous suggestions, "Blackbutts" and "Mimosa" were rejected by the Department of Education. However, at the December 1970 P&C meeting, the Principal announced that the school would officially be known as Mimosa Public School, which was later approved by the Minister for Education and Deputy Premier of New South Wales, Sir Charles Cutler.

In 1971 the school uniforms were worn for the first time, consisting of the chosen school colours of Green and Gold and Gordon Tartan. In early 1972, following months of effort, the design of the school crest and the school motto "Growth and Integrity" were presented and accepted at the May P&C meeting. In 1973, with the construction of Davidson High continuing, several classes were relocated to Mimosa, and stayed until 1974.

The subject of a new school, named Kambora Public School, was proposed in order to take the influx of students into local area schools at the time, with Mimosa's population peaking at 1130 students by 1979. Initially, Kambora was to have been opened by 1976, but was delayed until 1979.

In April 1982, after an extraordinary meeting of the P&C, the Mimosa Concert Band was established along with a Band Committee to support band-related activities.

In 1993 Mimosa received the Director General's Award for excellence in the Performing arts, recognising the school's achievements in music, dance and drama.

Principals

See also 

 List of Government schools in New South Wales
 Frenchs Forest
 Davidson
 Belrose

External links 
 Mimosa Public School Website
 New South Wales Department of Education and Training – Mimosa Public School

Public primary schools in Sydney
1970 establishments in Australia
Frenchs Forest, New South Wales
Educational institutions established in 1970
School buildings completed in 1970